Abraham Makoi Bol has been the Governor of Western Lakes State, South Sudan since 24 December 2015. He is the first governor of the state, which was created by President Salva Kiir on 2 October 2015.

Lt. Col Abraham Makoi Bol Kodi, is a South Sudanese veteran politician. He is from Rumbek Central County, from Nyang Agar Dinka subsection. Rumbek served as an Headquarter of SPLM/SPLA prior the signing of the CPA in Naivasha 2005. Abraham was the first Rumbek Central County Commissioner after the CPA. He served as Commissioner until the Sudan General election in 2010. Then contested for State Legislative Assembly under Rumbek town constituency, of which he successfully achieved and became MP until he was appointed as Governor of Western Lakes State.

References

Living people
South Sudanese politicians
Year of birth missing (living people)